Gharqabad (also Romanized as Gharqābād and Gharaqābād; also known as Ghargh Abad *** ancient name is Karagava {(Ava means place like Sava and Ava)  and (Karag means Tax) local name still is Kargava ) is a city in Nowbaran District, in Saveh County, Markazi Province, Iran.  At the 2006 census, its population was 4,394 in 1,229 families.

References

Populated places in Saveh County

Cities in Markazi Province